Faça Sua História is a TV series of Brazilian TV Globo Network, aired from April to December 2008. The series pilot was led by Stepan Nercessian, aired on December 27, 2007. Later on 6 April 2008 the series debuted with Vladimir Brichta as the protagonist Oswald.

Pilot cast 
 Stepan Nercessian – Oswald
 Luiz Gustavo – Passenger
 Paula Burlamaqui – Marlicene
 Rita Guedes – Ivonete
 André Gonçalves – Leleco
 Ernesto Piccolo – Haroldão
 Lidi Lisboa – Maria Eleuza
 Luis Miranda – Maribel
 Ana Paula Peter – Dorothy

 Special appearances
 Ney Latorraca – Father Creuze
 Arlindo Cruz – himself

Series cast 
Leading roles
 Vladimir Brichta – Oswald
 Carla Marins – Adalgisa (Gigi)
 Irene Ravache – Nadir

Secondary roles
 Luís Melo – Delegate Nicanor
 Júlio Rocha – Jackson Maia
 Gesi Amadeu – ibis
 Fabio Lake – Cacilda
 Diogo Kropotoff – Oswaldirzinho
 Elisabeth Petrenko – Maria Eduarda

Special appearances

1° Episódio - Quem Não Tem Um Caso Prá Contar 
 Tony Ramos - Passageiro
 Lidi Lisboa - Francineide
  - Dejair
 Ricardo Alegre - Turcão
 Robert Pacheco - Leleco
 Leonardo Arantes - Coisa Ruim
 ABM de Aguiar - Assaltantes

2° Episódio - A Vingadora Capixaba 
 Sidney Magal - Passageiro
 Giselle Itié - Maria da Glória
 Mateus Solano - Cléber Augusto
 Larissa Bracher - Vanessa
 Jorge Lucas - Pererinha

3º Episódio - O Califa de Copacabana 
 Duda Ribeiro - Passageiro
 Lúcio Mauro - Baby de Moraes
 Maitê Proença - Bebete
 Cristina Prochaska - Carmem Lúcia
 Gabriela Alves - Neusa
 Michelle Martins - Angélica
 Quitéria Chagas - Selminha
 Cláudio Caparica - Maitre do restaurante

4º Episódio - Oswaldir Superstar 
 Ernesto Piccolo - Passageiro
 Milena Toscano - Cíntia
 Danton Mello - Johnny Valenti
 Flávio Baiocchi - Bruce
 Jorge Lucas - Pererinha

5º Episódio - Miss Garota Suborbana
 Karina Dohme - Andressa
 Maurício Mattar - Passageiro
 Alonso Gonçalves - Napoleão Santana
 Dig Dutra - Joseane
 Sabrina Rosa - Gislaine
 Wagner Trindade - Adílson
 Aline Fanju - Dinorá
 Márcio Fonseca - Maribel
 Luciano Vidigal - Meio-Quilo
 Lívia Nascimento - Janaína
 Arley Velloso - Inácio Benevides
 Liz Moraes - Nívia

6º Episódio - A Estrela da TV 
 Maria Zilda Bethlem - Dora Maria
 Antônio Pitanga - Passageiro
 Kiko Mascarenhas - Dorgival
 Pia Manfroni - Malvina
 Maria Eduarda - figurinista

7° Episódio - Caramuru 
 Guilherme Piva - Passageiro
 Bento Ribeiro - Caramuru
 Ricardo Nunes - São Jorge
 Nana Gouvêa - Veranista
 Ricardo Pavão - Lilico
 Marcello Gonçalves - Deulino
 Eduardo Magalhães - Genésio
 Jamil Velazquez - Juca
 William Vita - homem misterioso
 Hilton Castro

8° Episódio - Cabritada Mal-Sucedida 
 Natália do Vale - Passageira
 Carlos Meceni - Seu Crécio
 Marcelo Flores - Sandoval
 Jonathan Azevedo - Mais-Preto
 Marcello Melo - bandido de Seu Clécio
 Duse Nacaratti - senhora que apresenta o novo táxi a Oswaldir
 Caco Baresi - policial
 Marcelo Portinari - bandido

9° Episódio - O Noivo Sumiu! 
 Márcia Cabrita - Passageira
 Henri Castelli - Pedrão
 Suzana Pires - Jennifer
 Ana Paula Pedro - Kátia
 Luiz Magnelli - Batista

10° Episódio - Olho de Sogra 
 Roberto Battaglin - Luís Augusto
 Karina Mello - Laura
 Malu Valle - Dorotéia
 Mariana Vaz - Isabela
 Thiago Fragoso - Tiago
 Luli Müller - Bruna
 Hugo Resende - Marcos

11° Episódio - Duas É Demais! 
 Paulo César Grande - Passageiro
 Ellen Rocche - Stefany
 Chico Terrah - Bigú
 Thogun - Miúdo

12° Episódio - Eterno Amor 
 Luiza Mariani - Passageira
 Mário Hermeto - Gilson
 Débora Lamm - Ivonete
 Marcelo Torreão - Adelsão
 Márcio Machado - Linguiça

13° Episódio - O Último Casal Feliz 
 Louise Cardoso - Verônica
 Débora Lamm - Ivonete
 Leonardo Netto - Celso
 Maria Zilda Bethlem - Letícia Barros

14° Episódio - A Última Farra 
 Cláudia Mauro - Passageira
 John Herbert - Mariozinho
 Lafayette Galvão - Ernesto
 Isaac Bardavid - Garrastazu
 Paulo Ascenção - Policial Martins

15° Episódio - Mulher no Volante 
 José D'Artagnan Júnior - Passageiro
 Harildo Deda

16º Episódio - O Dia Mais Feliz da Minha Vida 
 Gilberto Miranda - Passageiro
 Zeca Pagodinho - ele mesmo
 Rodrigo Rangel - Policial Silva
 Maria de Sá - senhora
 Anídia Martins - senhora
 Vera Maria Monteiro - Dona Sueli
 Celma Braga - senhora
 Suzana Pires - Jennifer

17º Episódio - Um Cadáver Ilustre 
 Fúlvio Stefanini - Passageiro
 Gláucio Gomes - Alberico
 Joél Reinoso - Juraci

18º Episódio - Todo Mundo Louco 
 Zéu Britto - Moacir
 Bete Mendes - Iracema
 Anna Cotrim - Dr. Nadine
 Roberto Oliveira

19º Episódio - A Rainha da Uva 
 Tião D'Ávila - Aristeu
 Guida Viana - Idalina
 Fiorella Mattheis - Manuela

20º Episódio - Em Nome dos Filhos 
 Íris Bustamante - Sílvia
 Gilberto Hernandez - Paulo
 Ângelo Antônio - Frei Marcos
 Carolyna Aguiar - Dadá
 Adriana Zattar - Lia
 Célia Virginia - Creide
 Cláudio Andrade - Julinho
 Arnaldo Klay - Fabrício
 Cláudio Cinti - Pedro
 Eliene Narducci - Carmem
 Luiz Otávio Moraes - Dr Moreira

21º Episódio - O Estouro da Boiada 
 Augusto Madeira - Passageiro
 Luiz Carlos Vasconcelos - João Grande
 Elisa Lucinda - Astéria
 Juliana Alves - Domingas
 Sabrina Rosa - Sgundina
 Contia Rosa - Tercina
 Michelly Campos - Quartina
 Luana Xavier - Quintina
 Livia Thaynara - Sestina
 Daniele Aguiar - Sabatina
 Marcelo Gonçalves - Passo Preto
 José Mauro Brant - Murilo Porco
 Babú Santana - Boca Vedo
 Jorge Lucas - Lindomar

22º Episódio - Corrida Noturna 
 Marcos Frota - Passageiro
 Val Perre - MV Tião
 Ed Oliveira - Cabeça
 Lugui Palhares - Arnoldão
 Luciana Pacheco - Regininha

23º Episódio - A Herança de Napoleão 
 Fernanda Paes Leme - Evelyn
 Alonso Gonçalves - Napoleão Santana

24º Episódio - Amigo é Para Essas Coisas 
 Yaçanã Martins - Passageira
 Larissa Bracher - Melinha Lee
 Bruna Bueno - Shirley

25º Episódio - A Deusa Extraterrestre 
 Thelmo Fernandes - Normando
 Valéria Bohm - Marialva

26º Episódio - Bandeira 5 
 Nizo Neto - Passageiro
 Juliana Knust - Vanessa
 Bruno Padilha - Ricardinho

27º Episódio - Álbum de Família 
 Ilva Niño - Passageira
 Cristiana Oliveira - Talita
 Carlos Vieira - professor de simulação de parto
 Luiz Octavio de Moraes - médico
 Aline Fanju - Passageira

28º Episódio - A Guerra de Tróia 
 Kadu Moliterno - Passageiro
 Juliana Knust - Vanessa
 Roney Villela - Raimundão
 Thiago Varella - Papagaio

29º Episódio - Sob As Ordens de Mamãe 
 Irene Ravache - Nadir
 Luís Melo - Delegado Nicanor
 Jayme Del Cueto - Gabriel Salvador

30º Episódio - A Matadora 
 Armando Babaioff - Passageiro
 Camila Morgado - Maria Teresa, a Maníaca da Tesoura

31º Episódio - O Sósia 
 Ricardo Kosovski - Passageiro
 Giselle Itié - Guadalupe
 Charles Myara - gerente de banco
 Mário Hermeto - Candeias
 Adriana Birolli - Passageira
 Chris Moniz
 Marcelo Assumpção
 Leo Alberty

32º Episódio - A Falta que Ela me faz
 Nuno Leal Maia - Passageiro
 Paola Oliveira - Georgette

33º Episódio - Cinema Novissímo 
 Buza Ferraz - Passageiro
 Luana Piovani - Sandra Sandrelli
 Jackson Costa - Nelson Roque
 Marcelo Olinto - Assunção

34º Episódio - O Feitiço da Cueca
 Marcos Breda - Passageiro
 Luana Piovani - Sandra Sandrelli
 Jackson Costa - Nelson Roque
 Isaac Bardavid - José Carlos Barreira

35º Episódio - A Estrela de Irajá 
 Arlindo Lopes - Passageiro
 Camila Pitanga - Suzete da Silva / Cherry Davis
 João Velho - Passageiro
 Mateus Solano - Toby Crane
 Selma Lopes - Vizinha

36º Episódio - Super-Mamãe Suzete 
 Ruth de Souza - Passageira
 Camila Pitanga - Suzete da Silva / Cherry Davis
 Sérgio Mastropasqua - Edgar
 Lafayette Galvão - Abílio
 Victor Pecoraro - Sérgio
 Bruno Vieira - Pedro
 Kate Lyra - Rita

37º Episódio - Noel da Conceição 
 Inez Viana - Passageira / Carmem Dorotéia
 Pedro Paulo Rangel - Noel Rosa da Conceição
 Miguel Oliveira - Jéferson
 Henrique Neves - Oscarzinho José
 Márcio Machado - Camile Kidman

External links
 

2007 Brazilian television series debuts
Brazilian anthology television series